The Bar is a 24-hour music network produced by Waitt Radio Networks. Its playlist is composed of Country/Rock music spanning from the 1960s to today from artists such as George Strait, The Eagles, Toby Keith, Bob Seger & The Silver Bullet Band, Johnny Cash, etc. that mainly targets listeners ages 18–54. This satellite-driven feed has got its name from a Bar, an establishment that usually serves alcoholic beverages to its customers.

Although "The Bar" will not be affected by the acquisition of Waitt Radio Networks by Triton Media Group, it will likely be relocated into Dial Global's portfolio.

While most affiliates use "The Bar" imagery, one station (in a dry i.e. no alcohol sales area) uses an alternative of "The West Texas JukeBox". That station is KBXJ Los Ybanez, Texas.

External links 
The Bar - Info from Waitt Radio Networks

American radio networks